Jasmine Togo-Brisby (born 1982) is a South Sea Islander artist known for her sculpture installations and portrait photographs. She currently resides in Te Whanganui-a-Tara/Wellington and is one of few artists that centres Pacific slave labour as the focus of her practice.

Early life 
Togo-Brisby was born in 1982 in Queensland, Australia. The early years of her life were spent in Tweed Heads, Northern New South Wales and then later in Townsville and Mackay, Queensland. She traces her ancestral lineage to the islands of Ambae and Santo that make up the Pacific nation Vanuatu.

Her first memories of looking at South Sea archives is how her interest in photography began. South Sea Island culture developed out of these documented images. On an annual basis she remembers as a child, her community searching through archives to piece together their history and locate their ancestors. Togo-Brisby's multidisciplinary art practice is described as being "personally motivated" by curator, Gordon-Smith. Togo-Brisby says: Through my work I’m trying to create another space for our ancestors to exist within.Subsequent to completing High School, TogoBrisby relocated to Brisbane in 2012 Togo-Brisby and completed a Diploma of Visual Art at the Southbank Institute of Technology. She went on to study a Bachelor Degree (Honours), in Fine Art at Massey University, Te Whanganui-a-Tara/Wellington and Griffith University, Southbank, Brisbane completing in 2017. In 2019 she studied for a Masters in Fine Art also at Massey University.

Career 
Togo-Brisby is best known for her exploration of South Sea Islanders and the historical to present-day impact slavery has had on her community.

Togo-Brisby's sculpture Bittersweet (2013–2015) was first exhibited in Aotearoa at Te Uru, curated by Ioana Gordon-Smith. The catalyst for this work was the uncovering of a large scale unmarked burial ground on what was previously a plantation in the northeastern state of Queensland in Australia. The work is described: "Installed on a plinth in a dark gallery, a pile of skulls cast in unrefined sugar and resin glisten under the gallery lights, giving off a sickly-sweet smell."

Her exhibition Dear Mrs Wunderlich (2020), alludes to the unearthing of records she had been investigating that authenticate the blackbirding of her great-great-grandmother, who became the legal property of the Wunderlich family in the 1800s.

She opened her first major solo exhibition Hom Swit Hom (2022) at Artspace Mackay in Mackay, Queensland. Togo-Brisby says: Mackay has the largest population of Australian South Sea Islanders, so this is a monumental exhibition for me and something that has been a long time coming.

Solo exhibitions 
2013

 Jugglers Art Space, Brisbane

2019

 Birds of Passage, Dunedin School of Art, Dunedin
 Adrift, Page Blackie Gallery, Wellington

2020

 Dear Mrs Wunderlich  Page Galleries
 If these walls could talk, they'd tell you my name, Courtenay Place Park Light Boxes, Wellington
 From Bones and Bellies, CoCa, Christchurch
2022

 Hom Swit Hom Artspace Mackay, Queensland, Australia

Group exhibitions 
2013

 Head & Sole, Logan Art Gallery, Logan Central, Queensland, Australia
 Echoes ASSI 150, The Centre Beaudesert, Beaudesert, Queensland, Australia
 Memories from a Forgotten People: 150 Years of Australian South Sea Islander, State Library of Queensland, Southbank, Australia
 Journey Blong Yumi: Australian South Sea Islander, Logan Art Gallery, Logan Central, Queensland, Australia
2014
 DNA: Deadly Nui Art, Black Dot Gallery, Melbourne, Victoria, Australia. Artists: Jasmine Togo-Brisby, Tony Tai, Damien Shen, Mariaa Randall, Francis Tapueluelu, Chanel Winarti, and Lily Aitui Laita
2015
 Fish hooks & Moving Trees (touring exhibition), BEMAC, Brisbane + Bundaberg Regional Art Gallery, Queensland, Australia
 From here to there (touring exhibition), Pine Rivers Museum + Noosa Regional Art Gallery, Queensland, Australia
2016
 Influx (touring exhibition), St Paul Street Gallery, Auckland + Pataka Art + Museum, Porirua, Wellington
 Handle with Care, Te Uru, Auckland
 Fifty Shades of Blak, Black Dot Gallery, Victoria, Australia
 Vai Niu Wai Niu Coconut Water, Caboolture Regional Art Gallery, Queensland, Australia
2017
 Colonial Sugar - Tracey Moffat & Jasmine Togo-Brisby, City Gallery Wellington, Wellington
2018
 Worn Identities, New Zealand Portrait Gallery, Wellington
 Seeing Moana Oceania, Auckland Art Gallery/Toi o Tāmaki, Auckland
 OCEANIA, Beaudesert Regional Gallery, Queensland
 From where I stand, my eye will send a light to you in the North, Te Tuhi Centre for the Arts, Auckland
 WANKTOK (touring exhibition), Dowse Art Museum, Lower Hutt, Wellington + Māngere Arts Centre - Ngā Tohu o Uenuku, Auckland
2019
 Tākiri: An Unfurling, New Zealand Maritime Museum, Auckland
 Beyond Kapene Kuku/Captain Cook, Page Blackie Gallery, Wellington
 Auckland Art Fair, The Cloud, Queens Wharf, Auckland
 Plantation Voices: Contemporary conversations with Australian South Sea Islanders, State Library of Queensland, Australia
2020

 Mana Moana:Volume 2: Digital Ocean, (17–25 July) Wellington, New Zealand. Artists: Dr Karlo Mila, Michel Tuffery, Dr Johnson Witehira, Warren Maxwell, Jasmine Togo-Brisby, Kereama Taepa, Louise Potiki Bryant, Tina Ngata, Terri Ripeka Crawford, Kura Puke, Stuart Foster, Kurt Komene, Horomona Horo, Laughton Kora, Regan Balzer, Cathy Livermore, Jess Feast, Rob Thorne. Curated by Rachael Rakena and Mike Bridgman 
2022

 Declaration: A Pacific Feminist Agenda, Auckland Art Gallery, Toi o Tāmaki, Tāmaki Makarau, New Zealand. Artists: Jasmine Togo-Brisby, Marti Friedlander, Jessicoco Hansell, Taloi Havini, Lonnie Hutchinson, Ioane Ioane, Sione Monū, Suzanne Tāmaki, Latai Taumoepeau, Molly Rangiwai-McHale & Luisa Tora and Kalisolaite ’Uhila.

Awards and residencies 
 2016 – Pasifika Excellence Awards – Massey University
 2017 – Pasifika Excellence Awards – Massey University 
 2019 – Tautai | Otago Polytechnic Dunedin School of Art – Artist in Residence

Footnotes

References 

1982 births
Living people
New Zealand women sculptors
Australian women sculptors
Artists from Queensland
Australian people of Vanuatuan descent
Massey University alumni